Arthur Kinyanjui Magugu (1934 – 15 September 2012) was a Kenyan politician who served as Minister for Finance from 1982 to 1988. He was a beneficiary of the Kennedy Airlift in 1959. As a KANU MP  he represented the Githunguri Constituency from 1969 to 1988, and from 2002 to 2007.

References

1934 births
2012 deaths
Ministers of Finance of Kenya
Kenya African National Union politicians
Members of the National Assembly (Kenya)
People from Nairobi